The 1944 German Ice Hockey Championship was the 28th season of the German Ice Hockey Championship, the national championship of Germany. Kriegsspielgemeinschaft Berlin, a wartime combined team of Berliner Schlittschuhclub and SC Brandenburg Berlin won the championship by defeating LTTC Rot-Weiß Berlin in the final.

First round

Group A

Group B

Group B Tiebreak

3rd place

Final

References

External links
German ice hockey standings 1933-1945

Ger
German Ice Hockey Championship seasons
Champion